The Svea Research Station is a Swedish research facility in Antarctica, established in 1987/1988.

Svea is located in the Scharffenbergbotnen valley in the Heimefrontfjella mountain range, about 400 km from the coast. It is a satellite station to the Wasa Research Station, and is used by small, transient research teams performing fieldwork in the area.

The station is currently the home base for two permanent monitoring projects: continual geodetic measurement using GPS technology, run by the Royal Institute of Technology in Stockholm, and a seismograph that records movements in the earth's crust, run by the German Alfred Wegener Institute.

See also
 List of Antarctic research stations
 List of Antarctic field camps
 Swedish Polar Research Secretariat
 Wasa Research Station
 Crime in Antarctica

References
''This article is based on information from the Swedish Wikipedia-article about the same subject, and on information obtained from the official site of the Swedish Polar Research Secretariat.

Outposts of Queen Maud Land
Buildings and structures completed in 1988
Princess Martha Coast
1987 establishments in Antarctica
Sweden and the Antarctic